Eucalyptus rugosa, commonly known as the Kingscote mallee, is a species of mallee that is endemic to coastal areas of southern Western Australia and South Australia. It has smooth bark, lance-shaped adult leaves, flower buds in groups of between seven and thirteen, white flowers and cup-shaped, conical or hemispherical fruit.

Description
It has smooth, cream-coloured to grey bark, sometimes with strips of bark hanging in the upper branches. Flowering occurs from September to November or from January to February or May and the flowers are white.

Taxonomy and naming
Eucalyptus rugosa was first formally described in 1903 by William Blakely from an unpublished manuscript by Robert Brown. Blakely's description was published in his book A Critical Revision of the Genus Eucalyptus. The specific epithet (rugosa) is from the Latin rugosus meaning "wrinkled", referring to the buds and fruit.

Distribution and habitat
Kingscote mallee grows in mallee shrubland in shallow soils over limestone in coastal districts. Dean Nicolle considers the species to be endemic to South Australia, occurring between Fowlers Bay in the east to the south-east coast and Kangaroo Island, but E. rugosa is also considered to occur in Western Australia by the Western Australian Herbarium.

Conservation status
This mallee is listed as "not threatened" in Western Australia by the Western Australian Government Department of Parks and Wildlife.

See also
List of Eucalyptus species

References

Eucalypts of Western Australia
rugosa
Myrtales of Australia
Plants described in 1934
Taxa named by Robert Brown (botanist, born 1773)